Sir William George Eden Wiseman, 10th Baronet   (1 February 1885 – 17 June 1962) was a British intelligence agent and banker.  He was a general partner at American investment bank Kuhn, Loeb & Co. from 1929 till 1960.

Life 
The grandson of Sir William Wiseman, 8th Baronet, a British naval officer, he was educated at Winchester College and Jesus College, Cambridge. He was appointed a second lieutenant in the Royal Cardigan Artillery Militia on 30 April 1902.

As a businessman, before the outbreak of the First World War he was chairman in London of Hendens Trust.  From 1914, he served as a lieutenant colonel with the Duke of Cornwall's Light Infantry but, following injury, transferred to military intelligence.  He was sent by Secret Intelligence Service director, Mansfield Smith-Cumming, to establish the agency's office in New York, 'Section V'. As the head of the British intelligence mission in the United States, Wiseman was extensively involved in the counter-intelligence against the Indian seditionists and was ultimately responsible for leaking to New York Police, bypassing diplomatic channels, the details of a bomb plot that led to the uncovering of the Hindu Conspiracy.

Wiseman acted as a liaison between Woodrow Wilson and the British government.  He and his associate General Julius Klein were closely associated with Special Advisor to Wilson Colonel Edward M. House. He met with Wilson on a regular basis and on one notable occasion in August 1918 spent a week's vacation with the President and House. Wiseman was also a mentor to spy chief William Stephenson. He was made a Companion of the Order of the Bath, In recognition of services in connection with the War, in the King's 1918 Birthday Honours.

After the war, Wiseman was a participant in the 1919 Paris Peace Conference. He remained in the U.S. as an employee of Kuhn Loeb, becoming a partner in 1929.

References

See alsol
 Foreign policy of the Woodrow Wilson administration

Further reading
 Fowler, W.B. British-American Relations 1917–1918. The Role of Sir William Wiseman (Princeton University Press, 1969). online review also dissertation version

External links
Sir William Wiseman papers (MS 666). Manuscripts and Archives, Yale University Library. 
Sir William George Eden Wiseman, 10th Bt. entry in the Oxford Dictionary of National Biography

Wiseman, Sir William, 10th Baronet
Wiseman, Sir William, 10th Baronet
Wiseman, Sir William, 10th Baronet
People educated at Stubbington House School
People educated at Winchester College
Alumni of Jesus College, Cambridge
Companions of the Order of the Bath
British Army personnel of World War I
Hindu–German Conspiracy
Duke of Cornwall's Light Infantry officers
Royal Garrison Artillery officers